Jos Bergmann (born 20 February 1969) is a former American rugby union player.

References 

Living people
1969 births
Female rugby union players
American female rugby union players
United States women's international rugby union players